The Waterboys are a band formed in 1983 by Mike Scott. The band's membership, past and present, has been composed mainly of Scottish, Irish, English, Welsh and American musicians, with Edinburgh, London, Dublin, Spiddal, New York and Findhorn serving as a base for the group. They have explored a number of different styles, dissolved in 1993 when  Scott departed to pursue a solo career and then reformed in 2000. They continue to release albums and tour worldwide. World Party was made up of former Waterboys members.

Over 85 musicians have performed live as a Waterboy. Some have spent only a short time with the band, contributing to a single tour or album, while others have been long-term members with significant contributions. Scott has stated that "We’ve had more members I believe than any other band in rock history" and believes that the nearest challengers are Santana and The Fall.

The Waterboys have gone through different musical phases as well as line-ups. In 2019 Scott wrote "The Waterboys is a timeless, genre-confounding band. We belong in no box."

Current members
 Mike Scott – vocals, guitar, piano (1981–94, 1998–present)
 Steve Wickham – electric fiddle, mandolin (1985–90, 2001–present) 
 Ralph Salmins – drums (2011–present) 
 Brother Paul Brown – keyboards, backing vocals (2013–present)
 Aongus Ralston – bass (2016–present)
 Zeenie Summers – vocals (2017–present)
 Jess Kavanagh – vocals (2017–present)

Former members

 Anthony Thistlethwaite – saxophone, bass, mandolin, harmonica (1982–1991, 2013) 
 Kevin Wilkinson – drums (1982–85) 
 Norman Rodger – bass (1983) 
 Preston Hayman – drums (1983) 
 Adrian Johnston - drums, piano (1983, 1985)
 Karl Wallinger – keyboards (1983–85) 
 Roddy Lorimer – trumpet (1983–1990, 2007) 
 Martyn Swain – bass (1984–85) 
 John Caldwell – guitar (1984) 
 Eddi Reader – backing vocals (1984) 
 Chris Whitten – drums (1984–85) 
 Frank Biddulph – fiddle (1985) 
 Marco Sin – bass (1985) 
 Lu Edmonds – bass (1985) 
 Max Edie – vocals (1985) 
 Guy Chambers – piano (1985–86) 
 Dave Ruffy – drums (1985–86) 
 Trevor Hutchinson – bass, bouzouki (1986–1991, 2013) 
 Peter McKinney – drums (1986–88) 
 Fran Breen – drums (1986–8) 
 Liam O'Connor – accordion (1987)
 Vinnie Kilduff – uilleann pipes, tin whistle (1987–89) 
 Colin Blakey – flute, whistle, piano (1987–90) 
 Tomas Mac Eoin – vocals (1988–89) 
 Jay Dee Daugherty – drums (1988–89, 2001) 
 Sharon Shannon – accordion, fiddle (1989–90, 2004) 

 Noel Bridgeman – drums (1989–90) 
 Ken Blevins – drums (1990–91) 
 Tim Sanders – sax (1990) 
 Simon Clarke – sax (1990) 
 Chris Bruce – lead guitar (1992–93) 
 Carla Azar – drums (1992–93) 
 Scott Thunes – bass (1992–93) 
 Jeremy Stacey – drums (1999–2000, 2006, 2008) 
 Richard Naiff – keyboards, flute (1999–2008, 2014) 
 Livingstone Brown – bass (1999–2000) 
 Gordon Davis – bass (2000) 
 Adam Snyder – keyboards (2000) 
 John Baggot – keyboards (2000) 
 Tom Windriff – drums (2000–2001) 
 Jo Wadeson – bass (2000–2001) 
 Ray Fean – drums (2001) 
 Ian McNabb – keyboards, bass  (2001, 2002) 
 Geoff Dugmore – drums (2001–03) 
 Paul Beavis – drums (2002) 
 Brad Waissman – bass (2002–03) 
 Carlos Hercules – drums (2003–06, 2009) 
 Steve Walters – bass (2003–06) 
 Liam Ó Maonlaí – keyboards (2005) 
 Mark Smith – bass (2006–09) 
 Damon Wilson – drums (2007–08) 
 John McCullough – keyboards (2009) 

 Katie Kim – vocals (2009–2012) 
 Ash Soan – drums (2009–2010) 
 Joe Chester – lead guitar (2009–2012, 2014) 
 Simon Wallace – keyboards (2009–2010) 
 Marc Arciero – bass (2009–2013) 
 Blaise Margail – trombone (2010–11) 
 Ruby Ashley – oboe, cor anglais (2010) 
 Sarah Allen – flute (2010–12) 
 Paul "Binzer" Brennan – drums (2010–12) 
 James Hallawell – keyboards (2010–13) 
 Kate St John – oboe, cor anglais (2011–12) 
 Melvin Duffy – pedal steel, guitar (2011–13)
 Sarah Calderwood – flute, vocals (2013) 
 Elizabeth Ziman – vocals (2013) 
 Chris Layer  – flute (2013)
 Malcolm Gold - bass (2013)
 Daniel Mintseris - keyboards (2013)
 Chris Benelli - drums (2013)
 Jay Barclay – guitar (2013–14)
 Shane Fitzsimons  –  bass (2014)
 Niall C. Lawlor  –  lap steel (2014)
 Zach Ernst – guitar (2014–16)
 David Hood – bass (2014–16)
 Jon Green – drums (2017)
 Bart Walker – guitar (2017)
 Neil Mahony - bass (2016, 2019)
 Jeff Adams – bass (2019)
 Eamon Ferris - drums (2021)

See also
 List of The Fall members
 Fairport Convention lineups

Citations and notes

References
 Scott, Mike (2012) Adventures of a Waterboy. Jawbone. London.

External links
 Official web pages for Mike Scott and The Waterboys
 Official Facebook page of The Waterboys

The Waterboys
Waterboys